Tectosternum is a genus of water scavenger beetles in the family Hydrophilidae. There is one described species in Tectosternum, T. naviculare.

References

Further reading

 

Hydrophilidae
Articles created by Qbugbot